Jarrod Ray Bunch (born August 9, 1968) is a former American football player and actor, as well as the head coach of the Beverly Hills High School football team.  He played college football for the University of Michigan from 1986 to 1990.  He was the number 1 pick for the New York Giants (27th overall) in the 1991 NFL Draft. Jarrod was named New York Giants Offensive Player of the year in 1992. In the 1993 training camp Jarrod sustained a knee injury that tore ligaments in his knee that sidelined him for seven weeks, upon his return his ability to play was greatly affected. After multiple surgeries in the offseason, he tried to recover his high level of play, however his contract with the Giants was terminated after he failed a physical examination before the start of 1994 season. He signed with Los Angeles Raiders two weeks later. Jarrod retired from football in 1995, and has kept himself very busy in entertainment and other activities. To aid in overcoming his injuries, he began studying martial arts, and is a 3rd Degree Black Belt in Brazilian jiu-jitsu.  He owns Bunch Time Production, a boutique production house that produces, commercials, web content, documentaries. He along with his wife Robin Emtage live in Beverly Hills California.

Early years
Bunch was born in Ashtabula, Ohio, in 1968.  At age five, he lost the fourth toe on his right foot in an accident involving a lawnmower. Bunch attended Ashtabula High School, where he was a star football player and set high school records in pole vault and discus. He became the first student from the school to be awarded a scholarship to attend a Division I college for football, as well as the first to go to the NFL.

University of Michigan
Bunch enrolled at the University of Michigan in 1986 and played college football as a fullback for the Michigan Wolverines football teams from 1987 to 1990. He came to Michigan intent on playing tailback, but with Jamie Morris securing that spot, Bunch was converted to the fullback position. Bunch started nine games at fullback in 1987, five games in 1988, five games in 1989, and 10 games in 1990. He also served as captain of the 1990 team that compiled 9–3 record, defeated Ole Miss in the 1991 Gator Bowl and finished the season ranked #7 in the final AP Poll.  In four years at Michigan, Bunch gained 1,346 rushing yards on 311 carries with eight rushing touchdowns. He also caught 30 passes for 215 yards and four touchdowns.

Bunch graduated with a bachelor's degree in Sports Management and Communications and used the fifth year of his football scholarship to attend graduate school.

Professional football

Jarrod was selected by the New York Giants in the first round (27th overall pick) of the 1991 NFL Draft.  As a rookie, Bunch appeared in 16 games, mostly on special teams,  He became a starter during the 1992 NFL season, starting 13 games at fullback while gaining 501 rushing yards, catching 11 passes for 50 yards, and scoring four touchdowns.  His average of 4.8 yards per rushing attempt in 1992 ranked second in the NFL.  In 1993, Jarrod sustained a knee injury in the first week of training camp.   and was used only sporadically in new head coach Dan Reeves'  offensive scheme.  Bunch was limited to 128 rushing yards (3.9 yards per carry), 98 receiving yards, and three touchdowns.

Bunch underwent surgeries on his knees and feet during the off-season before the 1994 NFL season.  Not being able to pass the physical because of his injuries, he was released by the Giants and signed with the Los Angeles Raiders as a replacement for Napoleon McCallum. However, his injuries continued to be a problem and he appeared in only three games for the Raiders. He was released by the Raiders in October 1994, marking the end of his NFL playing career.

Coaching career
In May 2020 Jarrod was chosen to be a participant in the National Football leagues, "Bill Walsh Diversity Coaching Fellowship" with the Los Angeles Rams.

On May 18, 2018, Bunch was introduced as the head coach of the Beverly Hills High School football team. He is the Normans third head coach in four seasons. Year one, he started the summer football program with 11 players. With a 23-player roster, the team went 2-8, the school's best record in 9 seasons. Year two, with only 17 summer participants and 25 players on the fall roster, the team went 3–7.

Later years
After his playing career ended, Bunch has been in entertainment as an actor and producer. He has his own production company Bunch Time Productions. He and his wife Robin Emtage moved to Beverly Hills, California in 2002. His acting credits include the role of the young George Foreman in the Emmy award-winning HBO film, Don King: Only in America.  He has also appeared as a guest star in many television series, Like, "The Forgotten" "ER", CSI Miami, Rizzoli & Isles, Entourage and others.... He appears in Quentin Tarantino's "Django Unchained" and is a principal actor in more than 100 national commercials.

Filmography
Reach Me (2014)
Django Unchained (2012)
Rizzoli & Isles - "I Kissed a Girl" (2010) TV Episode
The Forgotten - "Football John" (2010) TV Episode
Once Fallen (2010)
Doozers (2010)
Stileto (2009)
Good Time Max (2006)
The Death and Life of Bobby Z (2006)
Entourage - "What About Bob?" (2006) TV Episode
Two for the Money (2005)
ER - Refusal of Care (2005) TV Episode
JAG - "This Just in from Baghdad" (2004) TV Episode
The Kings of Brooklyn (2004)
100 Centre Street - "Daughters" (2001) - "Let's Make a Night of It" (2001) TV Episodes
Way Off Broadway (2001)
Chosen''' (2001)The Dancer' (2000)The Last Supper (2000)Third Watch - "Patterns" (1999) TV EpisodeThe Best Man (1999)After Hours Happy Hour (1999)18 Shades of Dust (1999)New York Undercover'' - "Catharsis" (1998) TV Episode

References

External links

1968 births
African-American players of American football
American football running backs
American male film actors
American male television actors
Living people
Los Angeles Raiders players
Michigan Wolverines football players
New York Giants players
Sportspeople from Ashtabula, Ohio
Players of American football from Ohio
21st-century African-American people
20th-century African-American sportspeople